Hannah Caroline Aase (12 July 1883 – 23 November 1980) was a botanist and cytologist.

Career 
Aase received a Bachelor of Arts from the University of South Dakota in 1906 and a graduate degree from South Dakota State College in 1928. In 1915, she received a PhD from the University of Chicago. In her 1915 dissertation, she studied the vascular anatomy of the megasporophylls of conifers. She found that plants in the Coniferales family generally reduce the number of sporophylls in the strobilus and a modified compound sporophyll appears later in disguised forms but loses one of the sporophyll members.

She became an instructor of botany at the State College of Washington in 1914 and taught morphology. She was a member of the faculty until 1949 and the first emeritus professor. She later studied the heredity of cereal grains. She crossed wheat with wild relatives in the 1930s and seems to have wanted to understand the ancestry of wheat, but unfortunately, much of her work has been lost. She often co-authored papers on Allium aaseae, Aase's Onion, with Francis Marion Ownbey, a fellow faculty member at WSU.

After her retirement, she continued in the field by reading technical journals. Washington State University has honored her legacy with the Aase Fellowship in Botany which used in the recruitment of new graduate students.

Eponyms 
Allium aaseae - Aase's Onion

Selected publications

Books 
 Aase, Hannah Caroline. Vascular Anatomy of the Megasporophylls of Conifers (1915). The Botanical Gazette
 Aase, Hannah Caroline and Gaines, Edward Franklin. To haploid wheat plant. Number 6 of Contribution (1926). State College of Washington. Dept. of Botany. Edition reimpresa of College of Agriculture and Exp. Sta. 13 pp.
 Aase, Hannah Caroline. Cytology of Triticum, Secale, and Aegilops hybrids, with reference to phylogeny (1930). Editor State College of Washington, 60 pp.
 Aase, Hannah Caroline and Ownbey, Francis Marion. Cytotaxonomic studies in Allium (1955). Number 1-3 of Research studies of the State College of Washington: Monographic supplement. Editor State College of Washington, 106 pp.

References 

American women botanists
Botanists with author abbreviations
20th-century American botanists
1980 deaths
1883 births
Washington State University faculty
20th-century American women scientists
American women academics